Naviair (Navigation Via Air) is a state-owned company in Denmark under the Ministry of Transport that provides air traffic service, including area control service for the Danish airspace and approach control for airports in Copenhagen, Roskilde, Aalborg, Billund, Esbjerg, and Ronne. It provides flight information service in the lower airspace of Greenland and the Faroe Islands. It provides flight information service for visual flight rules and for helicopters.

Naviair was created on January 1, 2001, through a split of the Danish Civil Aviation Administration (Statens Luftfartsvæsen) into a regulator (SLV) and an ANS provider (Naviair).

The chief executive officer is Carsten Fich.

External links
Naviair's official homepage in English

Government of Denmark
Air traffic control
Air navigation service providers
Danish companies established in 2001
Companies based in Tårnby Municipality